The Charles Lundwall Building, at 123-125 W. Main St. in Bozeman, Montana, was built in 1905 in Early Commercial style.  It was listed on the National Register of Historic Places in 2001.

It is a two-story building with a flat roof.

It is located two doors east from the six-story Baxter Hotel, the easternmost building in the Main Street Historic District.

References

		
National Register of Historic Places in Gallatin County, Montana
Buildings designated early commercial in the National Register of Historic Places
Buildings and structures completed in 1905
1905 establishments in Montana
Buildings and structures in Bozeman, Montana